is a Japanese singer, lyricist, composer and musician.

Biography
Megumi Hinata began learning to play the piano at the age of four, and said she first became interested in music in the latter half of elementary school, which she spent in the United States. After returning to Japan, she began writing lyrics and music, and participated in band activities at school.

Hinata is considerably fluent in English. Her lyrics often contain whole verses or choruses in English, and she has even written a few songs entirely in English. She has also translated lyrics for other artists from English to Japanese (Hilary Duff's song "I Can't Wait", for example) as well as from Japanese to English.

Career
Throughout her career, she has operated under many names. Under the direction of Kohmi Hirose, Megumi Hinata had her singing debut in 1998 as GUMI (グミ) and sang the theme song and several insert songs for the immensely popular Card Captor Sakura anime. She changed her solo stage name to meg rock in 2004.

In addition to her solo career, she had a side project with Akimitsu Honma from 2000 to 2001 called g.e.m., and another with Ritsuko Okazaki started in April 2002 called Melocure, which ended abruptly due to Okazaki's death in 2004. Melocure created music for a number of anime series including UFO Ultramaiden Valkyrie, Stratos 4, and Oku-sama wa Mahō Shōjo: Bewitched Agnes.

As a producer and lyricist, she is known either as meg rock, meg hinata or Megumi Hinata. She has produced songs for a great number of singers, the most famous of which include Chieko Kawabe, Nami Tamaki, and Shoko Nakagawa.

Discography

Singles
1998.04.22  Catch You Catch Me / HITORIJIME (ヒトリジメ) (as GUMI) – first season opening theme to Card Captor Sakura
2000.07.26  c/w you. (as g.e.m.)
2002.07.20  Itoshii Kakera (愛しいかけら) (in Melocure) – first season opening theme to UFO Ultramaiden Valkyrie
2003.02.01  1st Priority (in Melocure) – opening theme to Stratos 4
2003.10.22  Meguriai (めぐり逢い) (in Melocure) – second opening theme to UFO Ultramaiden Valkyrie
2005.02.23  Baby Low Tension (ベビーローテンション) (as meg rock) – opening theme to Peach Girl
2005.06.22  Natsu no Mukōgawa (夏の向こう側) (as Megumi Hinata) – third season opening theme to UFO Ultramaiden Valkyrie
2005.07.27  Home & Away (ホーム＆アウェイ) (in Melocure, c/w Kikuko Inoue's Jewelry) – opening theme to Okusama ha Mahō Shōjo
2005.11.09  clover (as meg rock) – opening theme to SoltyRei
2006.05.10  incl. (as meg rock) – ending theme to Joshikōsei GIRL'S HIGH
2008.10.22  Kimi no Koto (君のこと) (as meg rock)
2009.01.21  Egao no Riyū (笑顔の理由) (as meg rock) – opening theme to Asu no Yoichi!

Albums
2000.10.25  g.e.m. (as g.e.m.)
2004.03.17  Melodic Hard Cure (メロディック・ハード・キュア) (in Melocure)
2004.09.29  Loveboat (ラブボ) (as meg rock)
2008.02.27  mighty roller coaster (as meg rock)
2011.07.13  slight fever (as meg rock)

Miscellaneous songs
 "Chiisa na Uta" (in UFO Ultramaiden Valkyrie)
 "GO THE DISTANCE" (with MI:LAGRO)
 "PEACE WITHIN THE BRIGHTNESS" (with MI:LAGRO)
 "picnic" (as GUMI, in Card Captor Sakura)
 "super duper love love days" (as GUMI, in Card Captor Sakura)
 "Sweet Darling" (produced by Masaharu Fukuyama)

Production/work for other artists
 3B Lab.*: English adviser
 Aki Misato: "before", "Happiness"
 Ami Koshimizu: "KOKORO no Fukai TOKORO"
 Athena & Robikerottsu (Hello! Project): "Honki MEKIMEKI * TOKIMEKIMEKI", "Yuugure Sherbet"
 Bakemonogatari anime: "Staple Stable", "Kaerimichi," "Ambivalent World," "Ren'ai Circulation," "Sugar Sweet Nightmare"
 Chieko Kawabe: "be your girl", "Cry baby", "Hoshi ni Negai wo", "I Can't Wait" (Hilary Duff cover), "little wing"
 Chinatouchable: "Haru Harari", "Shōri no Hanabira"
 Cluster'S: "Ryūsei Shoot"
 Dir en grey: translation of all lyrics in Kyo's poetry book Zenryaku, Ogenki Desu ka? Saihate no Chi Yori Na mo Naki Kimi ni Ai wo Komete... into English
 Eir Aoi "SIRIUS"
 GARNiDELiA "ambiguous"
 Hisayo Mochizuki: "Heart Wing -Kokoro no Tsubasa-", "Himitsu", "Tanoshii Eikaiwa de Happy Life wo!"
 Kana Ueda: "Dry Curry", "Kaze ni Nosete", "Namida-biyori"
 Masumi Asano: "Funsui Kōen"
 Megumi Ogata: "SHINKA-SHINKA"
 Nami Tamaki: "better half", "New World"
 Nisemonogatari anime: "Futakotome", "Marshmallow Justice", "Platinum Disco"
 Peach Girl anime: "Atashi ga Shuyaku!", "Tashika na Mono"
 Ritsuko Okazaki: "Itsu de mo Hohoemi wo"
 Ryōko Shintani: "Hajimete"
 Sh15uya / SAE: "Sekai no Owari"
 SHIPS (in Kirarin Revolution): "LOVE*MEGA"
 Shoko Nakagawa: "Catch You Catch Me", "happily ever after", "Kimi ni Melolon", "Macaroon♥Holiday", "Ōedo ha Carnival!", "Sherbet-iro no Jikan", "Sora-iro DAYS", "through the looking glass", "Tsuzuku Sekai"
 UFO Ultramaiden Valkyrie anime: "Kimi wo Sagashiteru", "Marble", "Save♥", "STAR WORDS", "Watashitachi no Miracle"
 Umika as Yamako: "Ichigo Iro no Kimochi"

Sources and notes

External links
  official website

Japanese women singer-songwriters
Japanese women pop singers
Living people
20th-century Japanese women singers
20th-century Japanese singers
21st-century Japanese women singers
21st-century Japanese singers
Year of birth missing (living people)